Hermannsson is a surname. Notable people with the surname include:
Björgvin Hermannsson (born 1938), Icelandic former footballer
Hermann Hermannsson (1914–1975), Icelandic former footballer
Hjörtur Hermannsson (born 1995), Icelandic professional footballer
Martin Hermannsson (born 1994), Icelandic basketball player
Steingrímur Hermannsson (1928–2010), Prime Minister of Iceland
Sverrir Hermannsson (born 1930), Icelandic politician, businessman, and banker

See also
First cabinet of Steingrímur Hermannsson in Iceland was formed 26 May 1983
Second cabinet of Steingrímur Hermannsson in Iceland was formed 28 September 1988
Third cabinet of Steingrímur Hermannsson in Iceland was formed 10 September 1989
Hermansen
Hermanson
Hermansson

Icelandic-language surnames